Piletocera discisignalis is a moth in the family Crambidae. It was described by George Hampson in 1917. It is found in Assam, India.

References

discisignalis
Moths described in 1917
Taxa named by George Hampson
Moths of Asia